Frenchton is an unincorporated community in Upshur County, West Virginia, United States. Frenchton has a post office with ZIP code 26219.

The community derives its name from nearby French Creek.

References

Unincorporated communities in Upshur County, West Virginia
Unincorporated communities in West Virginia